Vilva is a rural locality (a settlement) in Gornozavodsky District, Perm Krai, Russia. The population was 341 as of 2010. There are 20 streets.

Geography 
Vilva is located 45 km north of Gornozavodsk (the district's administrative centre) by road. Vizhaysky Priisk is the nearest rural locality.

References 

Rural localities in Gornozavodsky District